The Western States Gospel Music Association (WSGMA) is an organization based out of California, formed in the late 1980s to extend the acceptance, influence and use of traditional gospel music in churches throughout California, Oregon, Washington, Nevada and Arizona.

Concerts & Music Production
The WSGMA hosts two or more concerts a Year.  Two of these events celebrate Armed Forces Day (3rd Saturday of May in Orange County) and Labor Day (1st Monday of September in Stanislaus County).  Each of these concerts showcase the artist groups individually along with a Gaither Style band and all artists gathered together to sing classic Southern Gospel hits and Patriotic Songs.

In 1994, the WSGMA released a Various Artists Cassette 10 Artists, 20 Songs with the Artist roster of that era.  In 1997 the charter members at that time recorded a Live CD Live Reunion Recording which was produced by Dennis Zimmerman.

President & Former Presidents of the WSGMA
 Randy Wold- Current President
 Herb Henry
 Dick Hillary
 Tim Williams
 Dennis Zimmerman

Current Artist Roster for the WSGMA
 California Melody Boys
 Evidence Quartet
 Herb Henry Family
 Johnson Family Quartet
 The Lighthouse Boys
 Reliance
 The Roberts
 The Rykert Trio
 Solid Ground
 Songfellows Quartet 
 Dick Hilleary (Chaplain)

Former Artists of the WSGMA

 4 His Love
 The Bravos
 The Californians
 Chosen Vision
 Circuit Riders
 The Cornells
 Crimson River Quartet
 Cross Roads New Revival
 Cross Roads Quartet
 Cullen & Co
 Golden State Quartet
 Goodnews Singers
 Gospel Truth Quartet
 The Gospelaires
 Grace Unlimited
 The Harrisons
 Harvest Time Quartet
 Heart's Desire
 Jericho Quartet
 The Johnson Family
 New Creations
 The Reflections
 The Regents of Southern California
 Reunion Quartet
 The Richland Trio
 Salt and Light Quartet
 Sevilles
 The Shaw Family (Citizens of Glory)
 Sister Christian
 Southern Journeymen
 Tradesmen
 Watchmen Quartet
 The Weatherfords

External links 
 WSGMA Official Website
 https://www.californiamelodyboys.org/
 http://www.evidencemusicministry.com/
 http://herbhenryfamily.com/
 http://www.thelighthouseboys.com/
 https://www.relianceministry.com/
 https://www.facebook.com/pages/The-Roberts/758275230872882/
 https://www.therykerttrio.com/
 http://www.solidground.us/
 https://songfellows.net/
 http://socalsoutherngospelconcerts.com Southern California Southern Gospel Concerts

References

Gospel music